Michael Kühne (born 7 March 1971) is a German diver. He competed at the 1992 Summer Olympics and the 1996 Summer Olympics.

References

External links
 

1971 births
Living people
German male divers
Olympic divers of Germany
Divers at the 1992 Summer Olympics
Divers at the 1996 Summer Olympics
Divers from Dresden
20th-century German people